Pintomyia nuneztovari is a phlebotomous sand fly in the subgenus Pifanomyia native to South America.  It was named by the entomologist who first described the species in the scientific literature, Venezuelan entomologist Ignacio Ortíz, to honor the scientific contributions of Manuel Núñez Tovar.

Distribution
Pin. nuneztovari occurs in Bolivia, Colombia, Guatemala, Honduras, Panama, Peru, and Venezuela.

Bionomics
Pin. nuneztovari has been found to readily bite humans indoors between 11:00 p.m. and 6:00 a.m.

Medical Importance
Genus Leishmania trypanosomes, responsible for the disease leishmaniasis, have been reported in Pin. nuneztovari from Bolivia.

References

Psychodidae
Insects described in 1954